This is a list of Estonian television related events from 1988.

Events
 25 February – in the television series "Panda", Juhan Aare started so-called Phosphorite War.

Debuts

Television shows

Ending this year

Births

Deaths

See also
 1988 in Estonia

References

1980s in Estonian television